From Here on In may refer to:

 From Here on In (The Living End album), 2004
 From Here on In (video album), 2004
 From Here on In (South album), 2001